The 2012 Hartlepool Borough Council election took place on 3 May 2012 to elect members of Hartlepool Borough Council. There were a number of differences in the composition of constituencies from the 2011 elections, including the absence of the Bruns, Dyke House, Grange, Greatham, Owton, Park, Rift House, Rossmere, St. Hilda, Stranton, and Throston wards. While the 2011 election had 15 available seats, the 2012 election had 36. Burn Valley, Foggy Furze, Hart, and Seaton wards each had two more seats than the previous year, and De Bruce, Fens & Rossmere, Headland & Harbour, Jesmond, Manor House, Rural West, and Victoria, which did not appear in 2011, all held three seats. The Labour Party once again dominated the election.

Election result

Ward results

References

2012 English local elections
2012
2010s in County Durham